The  Sri Lankan Ambassador to Cuba is the Sri Lankan envoy to Cuba. The Sri Lankan Ambassador to Cuba is concurrently accredited as Ambassador to Venezuela, El Salvador, Dominican Republic and Jamaica. The current ambassador is K. S. C. Dissanayake.

Ambassadors
 William Gopallawa
 Asoka de Silva
 Tamara Kunanayakam

See also
List of heads of missions from Sri Lanka

References

Sri Lanka
Cuba